Timothy Wong Man-kong is a historian from Hong Kong and associate professor within the Department of History at Hong Kong Baptist University. He earned a bachelor's degree from Hong Kong Baptist College followed by MPhil and PhD, both at the Chinese University of Hong Kong. Wong was elected a fellow of the Royal Historical Society in 2018.

Writings

Selected single authored books 

 Cross-cultural Perspectives on the History of Chinese Protestantism: A Collection of Essays《跨文化視野下的中國基督教史論集》. Taipei: Cosmic Light 宇宙光, 2006.

Selected co-authored books 

 A Documentary History of Public Health in Hong Kong. Hong Kong: Chinese University Press, 2018.
 Between Continuity and Changes: Studies on the History of Chinese Christianity since 1949.  Hong Kong: Alliance Bible Seminary, 2017.
 A History of Hong Kong Baptist University, 1956-2016.  Hong Kong: The Joint Publishing Company, 2016.
 A Centenary History of St. Paul’s Church, Hong Kong Sheng Kung Hui. . Hong Kong: Chung Hwa Bookstore, 2013.

Selected co-edited books 

 Western Tides Coming Ashore in a Changing World:Christianity and China's Passage into Modernity  Hong Kong: Alliance Bible Seminary, 2015.

Selected journal articles 

 "The China Factor and Protestant Christianity in Hong Kong: Reflections from Historical Perspectives", Studies in World Christianity,  8 (1): 115–137. doi:10.3366/swc.2002.8.1.115.

References

Living people
Year of birth missing (living people)
21st-century Hong Kong historians
Academic staff of Hong Kong Baptist University
Alumni of Hong Kong Baptist University
Alumni of the Chinese University of Hong Kong